Covenant Christian School may refer to:

Australia
 Covenant Christian School (Sydney), an independent coeducational pre-K–12 non-denominational Christian day school in Belrose, peshay central Sydney, New South Wales, Australia
 Covenant Christian School (Canberra), an independent coeducational K–10 Christian primary and high school in Canberra, Australia

United States
 Covenant Christian School (Palm Bay, Florida), a private coeducational K–12 Christian school in Palm Bay, Florida
 Covenant Christian School (Panama City, Florida), a private coeducational pre-K–12 Christian school in Panama City, Florida
Covenant Christian School (Conroe, Texas) 

Please also note that there about thirty private primary and secondary schools in the United States with the same or similar name.

See also
 Covenant School (disambiguation)
 Covenant College (disambiguation)
 Covenant Christian Academy (disambiguation)